Bakoli is a village located in India and it is listed under Tehsil and District North West Delhi in State Delhi. It is located 7 km towards East from District headquarters Kanjhawala, 6 km from North West Delhi and 24 km from State Capital Delhi. Pin code for Bakoli is 110036 and the Postal Head Office is Alipur.

Nearby places 
Khampur ( 2 km ), Mukhmel Pur ( 3 km ), Bakhtawar Pur ( 3 km ), Khera Kalan ( 4 km ), Kadipur ( 5 km ) are the nearby Villages to Bakoli.

Loni, Sonipat, Bahadurgarh, and Delhi are some of the nearest Cities to Bakoli.

Local Language 
Hindi is the Local Language here.

References 

Villages in North West Delhi district